Jun Kung (born August 18, 1977) is a drummer, singer-songwriter, producer, actor and multi-instrumentalist.

Biography 
He is known as "The drummer" in Hong Kong, and also an accomplished singer-songwriter, multi-instrumentalist and music producer. Born in Hong Kong and raised in Macau, he began his professional drumming career when he was 14. A proud alumnus of the "DRUMMERS COLLECTIVE" in NYC, he studied under such great drummers like Kim Plainfield, Ian Froman & Daduka Fonseca.
In the summer of 1999, he signed to a major label and released a self-produced album under Universal Music Group, which got multiple awards and Best Newcomer Award of 1999. In 2001, he joined Guitar icon Paul Wong and formed the group HANN, consequently releasing 5 albums under Universal Music Group. 
He has been a first call for hire drummer on tours since 2004. In 2007 he embarked on his first biggest world tour "The Year Of Jacky Cheung World Tour ‘07" for all 105 shows in over 57 cities. Jun's next feat was touring for Hong Kong/China singer Eason Chan, as drummer in the "DUO Eason 2010 Concert" held at the Hong Kong Coliseum consecutively from 20 March to 6 April 2010, and consequently continuing onto the "DUO World Tour" with the group.  His concert tours also included Faye Wong, Sandy Lam, early Khalil Fong, Terry Lin, Na Ying, Liang Bo, Han Hong, Tanya Chua, A-Mei, Vinx, Stu Hamm, Eugene Pao, Phil Chang (Zhang Yu), Danny Summer, Karen Mok, Kenny Bee, Alan Tam and more. Is considered one of the most iconic drummers in Hong Kong, Macau and the Greater China region.
With multiple solo albums, countless production work and over 200 released songs, he will continue touring, recording and producing for major artists from Hong Kong, Taiwan and Greater China.

Awards

Jun Kung, known as "The drummer" of Hong Kong, is an accomplished singer songwriter and music producer. In 1999, he was signed to "Universal Music Group" and released his first EP Here & Now. The acclaimed singles "Shoe Size" and "Love Space" won him the first place of the "Best New Artist" award at the Hong Kong Commercial Radio Music Award in 2000 and "Voice of the 21st Century award" from Metro Radio.
His original songs "Here to Stay" and "兩心花" has won "Best original film song" in the 30th and 31st Hong Kong Film Awards respectively , followed by the "Best Rock Artist" award from Chinese Music Media Awards in 2013. 2019 as a co-producer he also has been awarded the "Best Album of the Year (Hong Kong, Taiwan & overseas regions) from "Beijing Pop Music Awards", and the "Best Duet Song" for "5:59PM" from the Metro Radio Awards as the singer songwriter, featuring Yoyo Sham.

He continues to tour and record extensively as well as give lectures and master classes. He believes the only way to give back is to keep performing, sharing and giving young talented musicians a chance to make music their full-time job - a chance that was once given to him over 20 years ago.

Solo career 
Jun has recorded and released multiple solo albums both released under major labels and also independently.
Scored over 10 full length feature films and has held concerts as a solo artist yearly with audiences up to around 3–4 thousand audiences per show.
Jun also is venturing into different facets in his career and has been an ongoing supporter for charity organisation such as Hong Kong Dog Rescue.

Discography

Awards
2000 Best New Artiste award from Commercial Radio Hong Kong

2000 Voice of the 21st century award from Radio 104 FM Select

2011《Here To Stay》The 30th Hong Kong Film Award Best Original Film Song	

2012《Leung Sam Fa》The 31st Hong Kong Film Award Best Original Film Song	

2013 Best Rock Artiste award in 第十三届《华语音乐传媒大奖》

2019 Best Album Production of the Year (Hong Kong, Taiwan & Overseas Region) from Beijing Pop Music Awards

2019 Best Duet Song 《5:59PM》from Metro Radio Awards

Tour and shows
2004 Bobby McFerrin concert on Hong Kong Arts Festival

2005 Jacky Cheung 張學友 活出生命Live演唱會

2006 Coco Lee World Tour

2007 Jacky Cheung World Tour (over 105 cities in a year)

2008 Khalil Fong Wonderland World Tour (1 year)

2009 JustIn Lo -AIR JUSTIN World Tour

2011–2014 Eason Chan DUO World Tour

2012 Faye Wong World Tour (1 year)

2012 Sandy Lam- World Tour (1 year)

2015 Sandy Lam- Pranava World Tour

Solo concert
2002	 《My Live》solo concert

2002    《 Rock Affair 》Live @ Sydney Superdome 05/10/02

2010	《Jun on The Moon Live》solo concert

2012	《Playback》solo concert

2012   《Clockenflap》performed /
2013    《Clockenflap》 (as ambassador)

2015	《MOOV Live》Live @ Macpherson Stadium

2016 	《Just A Concert》Live @ Queen Elizabeth Stadium

2016/2017《Wow + Flutter》 Music Festival

2018    《Free Space》performed

2019     Macau《HUSH》Music Festival

2019   《Right Here Right Now》Jun Kung Live @ Macpherson Stadium

Filmography

Filmography

References

External links
Bitetone Presents – 2010 Our Best 20 Chinese Records (《Jun K》)

1977 births
Living people
21st-century Hong Kong male actors
Hong Kong male film actors